The Sullivan West Central School district is located in Western Sullivan County, New York.

Overview
The Sullivan West Central School district consists of two campuses: the High School is located in Lake Huntington, New York, and the Elementary School is located in Jeffersonville, New York.  Sullivan West Central School enrolls approximately 1,000 students in grades K-12.

History
The Sullivan West Central School district is one of New York's newest school districts.  The district includes three smaller schools which merged in 1999 to create the school.  These schools include the Jeffersonville Youngsville Central School, the Delaware Valley Central School, and the Narrowsburg Central School.

The Lake Huntington Campus finished construction and was opened in September 2003.

Sports
The Sullivan West Bulldogs compete in various leagues depending on the sport.  Most sports play in Class B against Burke Catholic, James I. O'Neil, Liberty, and Fallsburg.  However, football plays in Class C against schools such as Tri-Valley.

External links 
 Sullivan West

School districts in New York (state)
Catskills
Education in Sullivan County, New York
School districts established in 1939